Königswartha, in Sorbian Rakecy, is a municipality in the east of Saxony, Germany. It belongs to the district of Bautzen and lies 20 km north of the eponymous city.

The municipality is part of the recognized Sorbian settlement area in Saxony. Upper Sorbian has an official status next to German, all villages bear names in both languages.

"Rakecy" means "men of the crab" (rak being Sorbian for "crab"). The village was mentioned the first time in 1350.

Geography 
The municipality is situated in the Upper Lusatian flatland. The village stretches along the river Schwarzwasser.

Villages 
Several villages belong to the municipality:

Caminau (Kamjenej)
Commerau (Komorow)
Entenschenke (Kača Korčma)
Eutrich (Jitk)
Johnsdorf (Jeńšecy)
Königswartha (Rakecy)
Neudorf (Nowa Wjes)
Niesendorf (Niža Wjes)
Oppitz (Psowje)
Truppen (Trupin)
Wartha (Stróža)

References 

Populated places in Bautzen (district)